Salvatore Vincenti (born 5 March 1972) is an Italian male retired middle-distance runner, who won a gold medal at international senior level at the 1999 European Cup. He alsoparticipated at the 1999 World Championships in Athletics.

Biography
Vincenti also participated at two editions of the IAAF World Cross Country Championships (1999, 2002) at individual senior level.

Achievements

National titles
He won 7 national championships at individual senior level.
Italian Athletics Championships
5000 metres: 2001, 2002, 2003
Italian Indoor Athletics Championships
1500 metres: 1999, 2003
3000 metres: 2001, 2004

See also
 Italy at the European Cup

References

External links
 

1972 births
Italian male middle-distance runners
World Athletics Championships athletes for Italy
Living people
Italian male cross country runners